R. J. Cutler (born 1962) is an American filmmaker, documentarian, television producer and theater director.

His work includes the documentary films The War Room, A Perfect Candidate, Thin, The September Issue, The World According to Dick Cheney and Listen to Me Marlon; the non-fiction television series Black. White., American High, Freshman Diaries and 30 Days; the prime time drama series Nashville; the scripted podcast, The Oval Office Tapes; and the feature film If I Stay.

Cutler's first film, The War Room, was nominated for an Academy Award for Best Documentary Feature and he is the recipient of numerous awards including an Emmy, two Peabody Awards, a GLAAD Award, two Cinema Eye Awards, and two Television Academy Honor Awards.

In 2009, the Museum of Television and Radio held a five-day retrospective of his work.

Early life
Born in 1962, R. J. Cutler grew up in a Jewish home in Great Neck, New York. He attended Great Neck North Senior High School and graduated in 1979.

Cutler graduated from Harvard University in 1984. He received his AB degree magna cum laude with a Special Concentration in Dramatic Theory and Literature. He was the recipient of the prestigious Hoopes Prize.

In 1991, Cutler became a faculty member of the University of Southern California School of Theatre and a student at the USC School of Cinema-Television. Cutler has been producing and directing documentary films since 1992.

Early career
Cutler began his career as a theater director and was the first director selected to participate in the New York Drama League's Director's Apprenticeship Program. He worked as a director and producer at the American Repertory Theater and was director James Lapine’s assistant on the original Broadway production of the Sondheim/Lapine musical Into the Woods. He also served as Resident Director at New Dramatists.

In 1988, Cutler directed the workshop production of Jonathan Larson's musical Superbia at Playwrights Horizons. That workshop became one of the subjects of Larson's next musical Tick, Tick, Boom....

Productions directed by Cutler between 1988 and 1990 include the world premiere of Right Behind the Flag by Kevin Heelan at Playwrights Horizons (starring Kevin Spacey), the American premiere of Emerald City by David Williamson at the New York Theatre Workshop, and the world premiere of The Secret Garden by Marsha Norman and Lucy Simon at the Virginia Stage Company. The Secret Garden went on to run on Broadway for 709 performances.

In 1990, Cutler produced the National Public Radio show Heat with John Hockenberry. Other producers included future This American Life creator Ira Glass and future Radio Diaries creator Joe Richman. The show aired live five nights a week on NPR stations across the country and received a Peabody Award. In 1991, Cutler became a faculty member of the University of Southern California School of Theatre and a student at the USC School of Cinema-Television. Cutler has been producing and directing documentary films since 1992.

Documentary career
In 1992, Cutler and his producing partner Wendy Ettinger approached filmmakers DA Pennebaker and Chris Hegedus with the idea to produce a film about the Bill Clinton’s first presidential campaign. Filmed in classic cinema verite style, The War Room premiered at the Toronto Film Festival in September 1993 and went on to be screened at the New York Film Festival that same year and the Berlin Film Festival the following February. It was released theatrically by October Films on November 3, 1993. It received a 95% "Fresh" rating on Rotten Tomatoes. The War Room was nominated for an Academy Award for Best Documentary while in the same year, the film won the National Board of Review Award for Best Documentary Film.
In 2008, the filmmaking team behind The War Room reunited to catch up with their subjects 16 years later. The resulting film was called The Return of the War Room and it aired on Sundance Channel. It is also included as a special feature of the Criterion Collection edition of The War Room. In 2013, The Cinema Eye Honors awarded The War Room with its Legacy Award, "Intended to honor classic films that inspire a new generation of filmmakers."

In 1994, Cutler and co-director/producer David Van Taylor spent eleven months following the U.S. Senate campaign of Lt. Col. Oliver North who was running as a Republican to take the seat occupied by Democrat Charles S. Robb. North had risen to prominence as the key figure in the Reagan-era Iran-Contra scandal. The cinema verite film they made, A Perfect Candidate, featured access to both the North and Robb campaigns and told stories about non-candidates as well, including North strategist Mark Goodin, Washington Post reporters Don Baker and Peter Baker and Richmond Times-Dispatch reporter Mike Allen. A Perfect Candidate premiered at the Los Angeles Independent Film Festival in April 1996 and was released theatrically by Seventh Art Releasing on June 19, 1996.

In 2010, The Washington Post included A Perfect Candidate and The War Room on its list of Best Political Movies Ever.

In 1996, Cutler became the Supervising Producer of a weekly television show on then-nascent MSNBC called, Edgewise. Hosted by John Hockenberry, the show featured interviews, essays, and short documentary films produced by Cutler. In July 1997, the Nantucket Film Festival screened a program of ten of Cutler's Edgewise shorts. The following January, the Edgewise short Monte Hellman: American Auteur (directed by George Hickenlooper) was screened in competition at the Sundance Film Festival.

In 1999, Cutler set out to create the first network "nonfiction drama," a form of documentary serial storytelling that was new to American commercial prime time television. Cutler conceived of, developed and sold a television series called American High to Fox Television's drama division. Then he and two cinema verite crews spent an entire school year filming 14 students at Highland Park High School, a public high school 40 miles northwest of Chicago. Over the course of the year, they collected more than 2800 hours of footage, 70 percent of which was shot by Cutler's crews, and the rest of which was filmed by the students themselves with digital cameras provided by the filmmakers. This footage was then edited into 14 half-hour episodes.

American High premiered on Fox Television on August 2, 2000. American High was cancelled by Fox after four episodes. The series was picked up by PBS which aired all fourteen episodes in their entirety. In 2001, American High received the first Primetime Emmy Award for Outstanding Reality Program. It was nominated for the same award in 2002.

As a follow-up to American High, Showtime commissioned Cutler to spend the 2002–2003 school year with a group of freshmen at the University of Texas in Austin. As with American High Cutler and his team assembled a group of students, filmed them cinema verite style for the full school year and provided them with digital cameras so that they could contribute their own footage to the project as well. When Freshman Diaries premiered on Showtime in August, 2003, Steve Johnson wrote in The Chicago Tribune, "Yes, the new 'reality' genre has dominated television, too often with simple-minded tributes to hormones and humiliation. But it has also made room for some compelling new documentary work that networks likely would have never had the courage to put on TV. Case in point: Sunday's new Freshman Diaries". David Zurawik of The Baltimore Sun wrote, "This is the place where the immediacy, and edge, of reality TV meets the power of the documentary film to show us the world as seen through the eyes of others".

In 2003, as he was filming Freshman Diaries, Cutler created and directed the third in his trilogy of video diaries-driven documentary series, The Residents. Set among young physicians at UCLA Medical Center in Los Angeles, it told the stories of what it was like to make the transition from medical student to full-blown physician. The Residents premiered on Discovery Health Channel on October 12, 2003 and subsequently aired on The Learning Channel.

In 2005, Cutler joined forces with director/producer Kahane Corn and served as the Executive Producer of the AMC documentary Making ‘Dazed’ which told the story of the making of Richard Linklater's seminal 1993 film Dazed and Confused. The film premiered on AMC on September 18, 2005.

Also in 2005, Cutler was invited by executive producer Joe Berlinger to contribute a film to the History Channel's documentary series, Ten Days That Unexpectedly Changed America. Cutler produced and directed Shays Rebellion: The First American Civil War, which he conceived of as an animated documentary to be illustrated by Academy Award-winning animator Bill Plympton. Ten Days That Unexpectedly Changed America received the 2006 Emmy Award for Outstanding Nonfiction Series.

In 2007, Cutler spent seven months filming legendary Vogue editor Anna Wintour and her staff as they produced what was at the time the single largest single issue of a magazine that had ever been published: the September, 2007 Vogue, which weighed in at 840 pages and 4.1 pounds. The film that resulted was The September Issue, directed and produced by Cutler, and financed by A&E IndieFilms. While The September Issue features a host of Vogue personalities, designers, models, photographers, and others, its principal subject is the conflict-laden but deeply symbiotic relationship between the powerful, influential and notoriously frosty Wintour and her passionate fire-haired Creative Director Grace Coddington.

The September Issue received its World Premiere at the 2009 Sundance Film Festival, where it screened in competition and won the Grand Jury Prize for Cinematography. Roadside Attractions acquired the film shortly after Sundance and released it theatrically on August 28, 2009. The September Issue received the 2010 Cinema Eye Honors Audience Choice Award.

After completing The September Issue, Cutler returned to outtakes from the footage he shot with Wintour and edited a short film called The Met Ball, which told the story of the 2007 Metropolitan Museum Costume Institute Ball.

In 2009, Cutler produced the feature documentary Hick Town, directed by George Hickenlooper. It was their second collaboration, after 1997's American Auteur. Hick Town tells the story of then-Denver Mayor (later Colorado Governor) John Hickenlooper, who was the director's cousin, as the city of Denver was gearing up to host the 2008 Democratic National Convention. The film received its World Premiere at the 2009 Starz Denver Film Festival. Hickenlooper's intention was to turn the film into a non-fiction series, but the director died while shooting additional footage in 2010.

In 2010, Cutler made rag & bone, a short documentary that told the story of Marcus Wainwright and David Neville, the designers behind the design house rag & bone, as they prepared for 2010 Fall Fashion Week in New York City. The cinema verite film was funded by Starbucks.

In 2011, Cutler directed and produced Fish a twenty-minute film that told the story of Los Angeles chef Jon Shook, who with his partner Vinnie Dotolo had recently opened the Los Angeles-based restaurant Son of A Gun. The film was made as part of the USA Character Project and was presented by Ridley Scott and Tony Scott. In Fish, Cutler follows Shook as he goes fishing for a day and then turns the day's catch into a dish at Son of a Gun.

In 2012 Cutler signed a deal to make documentary films for Showtime. The first film in their partnership was 2013's The World According to Dick Cheney, which Cutler produced and co-directed with Greg Finton. The film premiered at the Sundance Film Festival in January 2013.

On April 26, 2013 Showtime announced that they had renewed their deal with Cutler to make documentary films for the pay cable network. The next film under the agreement was reported to be about legendary actor Marlon Brando, which Cutler would produce along with John Battsek (Searching for Sugarman) and which was to be directed by Stevan Riley (Fire in Babylon.)

On May 18, 2022, Disney Original Documentary and Disney+ announced that Cutler would co-direct a documentary with filmmaker David Furnish about Elton John's November 2022 shows at Dodger Stadium titled Goodbye Yellow Brick Road: The Final Elton John Performances And the Years That Made His Legend.

Scripted filmmaking career
In 2009 Cutler decided to focus exclusively on creative producing and directing.  "For me, the real satisfaction of the work is in the creative," he told Variety reporter Cynthia Littleton. Cutler made a deal to merge his production company's projects with Evolution Film and Tape, effectively shutting down Actual Reality Pictures.

In 2010, HBO ordered a pilot of Spring/Fall, a show set in the fashion industry and executive produced by Cutler, Jimmy Miller, and writer Kate Robin. The pilot was directed by Jake Kasdan and starred Tea Leoni and Hope Davis. It was not ordered to series.

In 2011, ABC ordered a pilot for Nashville, executive produced by Cutler, Callie Khouri and Steve Buchanan, president of Gaylord Entertainment (owner of the Grand Ole Opry.) Cutler and Khouri had developed the show together over several months under a deal at Lionsgate Studios. Nashville was ordered to series on May 11, 2012. Nashville premiered on ABC on October 9, 2012. Reviewing it in Entertainment Weekly, critic Ken Tucker wrote, "Rarely does a pilot present a world as completely as Nashville does in its first hour… One of the great pleasures of Nashville is that it arrived fully formed, with a sure sense of what it wants to accomplish dramatically, and with a masterful command of atmosphere and setting. No other new show this season projects such effortless assurance, hits so many notes of emotion." On May 10, 2013 Nashville was renewed for a second season by ABC. On May 9, 2014 Nashville was renewed for a third season by ABC.

In 2012 Lionsgate Television announced that it had entered into a two-year first-look television deal with Cutler to develop and produce scripted programming for broadcast and cable TV.

In 2013, CBS signed Cutler to direct the pilot of The Ordained, executive produced by Frank Marshall and written by Lisa Takeuchi Cullen. The show about a Kennedy-like political family starred Charlie Cox, Sam Neill, Audra McDonald, Jorge Garcia and Hope Davis. It was not ordered to series.

In 2013, MGM announced that it would finance Cutler's feature film directing debut, If I Stay. Warner Bros., New Line and MGM released If I Stay in theaters on August 22, 2014.

In 2014, CBS announced that it had entered into a two-year first-look television deal with Cutler to develop, produce and direct scripted projects. In 2016, his production company Cutler Productions signed a deal with Fox 21 Television Studios.

Style and influences
Cutler has cited Jim Bouton’s book Ball Four as an early influence on his story-telling and interest in non-fiction.

He listed his Best Movies Ever for Newsweek as Oliver Stone’s Wall Street, Elia Kazan’s On the Waterfront, Woody Allen’s Crimes and Misdemeanors, Preston Sturges’ The Lady Eve, Bob Fosse’s All That Jazz, Terrence Malick’s Badlands, Barbara Kopple’s Harlan County, USA and Sidney Lumet’s Dog Day Afternoon.

While making The September Issue Cutler was influenced by Robert Drew’s Crisis, the Maysles Brothers’ Gimme Shelter, George Cukor’s Philadelphia Story and Preston Sturges’ The Lady Eve.

Filmography

Films
The War Room (1993), producer
A Perfect Candidate (1996), director, producer
Thin (2006), producer, executive producer
The September Issue (2009), director, producer, executive producer
The World According To Dick Cheney (2013), director, producer, executive producer
If I Stay (2014), director
Listen to Me Marlon (2015), producer
Belushi (2020), director, writer, producer
Billie Eilish: The World's a Little Blurry (2021), director

Television
American High (2000), director, executive producer
Military Diaries (2002), executive producer
The Residents (2003), director, executive producer
Freshman Diaries (2003), director, executive producer
American Candidate (2004), executive producer
Bound For Glory (2005), executive producer
30 Days (2005-2008), executive producer
Black.White. (2006), executive producer
Nashville (2012), director, executive producer
Dear... (2020), executive producer

Podcasts
The Oval Office Tapes (2018), creator, director, executive producer

Bibliography

References

External links 

American film directors
Harvard University alumni
Living people
People from Great Neck, New York
20th-century American Jews
USC School of Cinematic Arts alumni
1962 births
Great Neck North High School alumni
21st-century American Jews